Szymon Pawłowski may refer to:

 Szymon Pawłowski (politician), Polish politician
 Szymon Pawłowski (footballer), Polish footballer